Crystal Ballroom, originally built as Cotillion Hall, is a historic building on Burnside Street in Portland, Oregon, United States. Cotillion Hall was built in 1914 as a ballroom, and dance revivals were held there through the Great Depression. Starting in the 1960s, the hall has also been host to many popular pop, rock, folk, blues and jazz artists, as well as beat poetry and other entertainment.

History

What is now known as the Crystal Ballroom was constructed in 1913–1914 and opened in early 1914, as Ringler's Cotillion Hall.

Originally owned by Montrose Ringler, the ballroom fell victim to heavy persecution of jazz and dance and Ringler lost the ballroom in the early 1920s. The ballroom was bought by Dad Watson in the mid-1920s, and largely held square dances during that period. After Watson's death in the 1930s, Ralph Farrier bought the ballroom and renamed it the Crystal Ballroom. He continued in Watson's footsteps, holding square dances through the 1950s.

In the early 1960s, due to flagging revenues, new acts were brought in, such as gypsy brass bands and R&B performers, such as James Brown, Marvin Gaye, and Ike & Tina Turner.

In 1967, largely psychedelic acts such as the Grateful Dead, Blue Cheer, and The Electric Prunes performed in the ballroom. This was cut short in 1968, due to concerns about what such music was doing to the youth of Portland.

From the 1970s through the mid-1990s, the ballroom was not used for any public events. It became a residence for squatters, artists and bohemians, who used it as studio space, and occasionally private invite-only parties were given. In 1979, the building was listed on the National Register of Historic Places as Cotillion Hall.

In 1997, the ballroom was re-opened by McMenamins, featuring Ringlers bar/restaurant on the first floor, the little sister of the historic Crystal Ballroom, Lola's Room, is located on the second floor, and the restored Crystal Ballroom on the third floor. 

The main ballroom features a mechanical "floating" dance floor, thought at the time of its building to be the only one on the West Coast, and is potentially the only one still in existence in the United States.

Following the reopening of the Crystal Ballroom in 1997, McMenamins expanded the nearby Crystal Hotel to reflect the historical significance of the Ballroom's memorable performances. The fifty-one guest rooms at the Crystal Hotel are named after songs or performances from the Crystal Ballroom's last one hundred years. The hotel also offers pre- and post-show concerts in conjunction with the Ballroom.

In 2000 or 2001 a large 20'x20' square opening was cut into the center/middle edge of the main ballroom floor to make additional fire exits in order to sell more tickets for live music events. This is potentially the only hole of its kind in a "floating" dance floor still in existence in the United States.

During the early hours of April 14, 2014, the ballroom was evacuated during a show by Schoolboy Q due to a possible crack in a support beam.

Oregon bands that have played at the Crystal Ballroom include Portland's Everclear in '01, Cherry Poppin Daddies in '02, Portland's The Decemberists in '14, Modest Mouse (originally from Seattle) in '04, The Shins (originally from New Mexico) in '05, and Portugal. The Man (originally from Alaska) in 2017.

Urban legend concerning Jimi Hendrix
An urban legend in the Portland area purports that on April 5, 1965, Little Richard fired guitarist Jimi Hendrix onstage during a concert at the ballroom, allegedly for lack of skill. This alleged incident has been played up in marketing literature for the ballroom published by McMenamins.  It is known that Little Richard did play the Crystal on that date, and that Hendrix was in his touring band for much of 1965.  In addition, the two men did have a rocky relationship, with Hendrix leaving and rejoining the tour several times.  However, there is no documented evidence that Hendrix played with Little Richard on that particular date, or that Little Richard fired any musicians onstage that day (Hendrix or otherwise).  In addition, Hendrix would appear with Little Richard at shows in other cities later that same month, and he had a well-established reputation as a guitarist by that point in his career.

Facilities
The Crystal Ballroom—the third floor of the building—has high ceilings, a balcony, grand chandeliers, murals, and wide floor-to-ceiling arched windows.

The room can be rented for group meetings of up to 1,000 people or, in concert configuration, up to 1500 standing persons or 850 seated.

References

External links

Venue website
List of bands who played at Crystal Ballroom during the R&B and psychedelic eras, from Pacific Northwest Bands.com

1914 establishments in Oregon
Ballrooms in the United States
Culture of Portland, Oregon
Event venues on the National Register of Historic Places in Oregon
McMenamins
Music venues in Portland, Oregon
National Register of Historic Places in Portland, Oregon
Portland Historic Landmarks
Nightclubs in Portland, Oregon
Southwest Portland, Oregon